This is a list of electoral divisions and wards in the ceremonial county of Norfolk in the East of England. All changes since the re-organisation of local government following the passing of the Local Government Act 1972 are shown. The number of councillors elected for each electoral division or ward is shown in brackets.

County council

Norfolk
Electoral Divisions from 1 April 1974 (first election 12 April 1973) to 2 May 1985:

Electoral Divisions from 2 May 1985 to 5 May 2005:

Electoral Divisions from 5 May 2005 to 2025:

† minor boundary changes in 2009 ‡ minor boundary changes in 2013

Electoral divisions from 2025:

District councils

Breckland
Wards from 1 April 1974 (first election 7 June 1973) to 3 May 1979:

Wards from 3 May 1979 to 1 May 2003:

Wards from 1 May 2003 to 7 May 2015:

Wards from 7 May 2015 to present:

Broadland
Wards from 1 April 1974 (first election 7 June 1973) to 3 May 1979:

Wards from 3 May 1979 to 10 June 2004:

Wards from 10 June 2004 to present:

Great Yarmouth
Wards from 1 April 1974 (first election 7 June 1973) to 1 May 1980:

Wards from 1 May 1980 to 10 June 2004:

Wards from 10 June 2004 to present:

King's Lynn and West Norfolk
Wards from 1 April 1974 (first election 7 June 1973) to 5 May 1983:

Wards from 5 May 1983 to 1 May 2003:

Wards from 1 May 2003 to 2 May 2019:

† minor boundary changes in 2015legislation.gov.uk - The King's Lynn and West Norfolk (Electoral Changes) Order 2013. Retrieved on 3 November 2015.

Wards from 2 May 2019 to present:

North Norfolk
Wards from 1 April 1974 (first election 7 June 1973) to 3 May 1979:

Wards from 3 May 1979 to 1 May 2003:

Wards from 1 May 2003 to 2 May 2019:

Wards from 2 May 2019 to present:

Norwich
Wards from 1 April 1974 (first election 7 June 1973) to 3 May 1979:

Wards from 3 May 1979 to 10 June 2004:

Wards from 10 June 2004 to 2 May 2019:

Wards from 2 May 2019 to present:

South Norfolk
Wards from 1 April 1974 (first election 7 June 1973) to 3 May 1979:

Wards from 3 May 1979 to 1 May 2003:

Wards from 1 May 2003 to present:

† minor boundary changes in 2007

Wards from 2 May 2019 to present:

Electoral wards by constituency

Broadland
Acle, Astley, Aylsham, Blofield with South Walsham, Brundall, Burlingham, Buxton, Coltishall, Drayton North, Drayton South, Eynesford, Great Witchingham, Hevingham, Horsford and Felthorpe, Lancaster North, Lancaster South, Marshes, Plumstead, Reepham, Spixworth with St Faiths, Taverham North, Taverham South, The Raynhams, Walsingham, Wensum, Wroxham.

Great Yarmouth
Bradwell North, Bradwell South and Hopton, Caister North, Caister South, Central and Northgate, Claydon, East Flegg, Fleggburgh, Gorleston, Lothingland, Magdalen, Nelson, Ormesby, St Andrews, Southtown and Cobholm, West Flegg, Yarmouth North.

Mid Norfolk
Abbey, All Saints, Buckenham, Burgh and Haverscroft, Cromwells, Dereham-Central, Dereham-Humbletoft, Dereham-Neatherd, Dereham-Toftwood, Eynsford, Haggard De Toni, Hermitage, Hingham and Deopham, Launditch, Necton, Northfields, Queen's, Rustens, Shipdham, Springvale and Scarning, Swanton Morley, Taverner, Templar, Town, Two Rivers, Upper Wensum, Upper Yare, Watton, Wicklewood, Wissey.

North Norfolk
Briston, Chaucer, Corpusty, Cromer Town, Erpingham, Glaven Valley, Gaunt, Happisburgh, High Heath, Holt, Hoveton, Mundesley, North Walsham East, North Walsham North, North Walsham West, Poppyland, Priory, Roughton, Scottow, St Benet, Sheringham North, Sheringham South, Stalham and Sutton, Suffield Park, The Runtons, Waterside, Waxham, Worstead.

North West Norfolk
Brancaster, Burnham, Clenchwarton, Dersingham, Docking, Fairstead, Gayton, Gaywood Chase, Gaywood North Bank, Grimston, Heacham, Hunstanton, North Lynn, North Wootton, Old Gaywood, Priory, Rudham, St Margarets with St Nicholas, Snettisham, South and West Lynn, South Wootton, Spellowfields, Springwood, Valley Hill, Walpole, West Winch.

Norwich North
Catton Grove, Crome, Hellesdon North West, Hellesdon South East, Mile Cross, Old Catton and Sprowston West, Sewell, Sprowston Central, Sprowston East, Thorpe St Andrew North West, Thorpe St Andrew South East.

Norwich South
Bowthorpe, Eaton, Lakenham, Mancroft, Nelson, New Costessey, Thorpe Hamlet, Town Close, University, Wensum.

South Norfolk
Beck Vale, Bressingham and Burston, Brooke, Bunwell, Chedgrave and Thurton, Cringleford, Dickleburgh, Diss, Ditchingham and Broome, Earsham, Easton, Forncett, Gillingham, Harleston, Hempnall, Hethersett, Loddon, Mulbarton, Newton Flotman, Old Costessey, Poringland with The Framinghams, Rockland, Roydon, Scole, Stoke Holy Cross, Stratton, Tasburgh, Thurlton.

South West Norfolk
Airfield, Conifer, Denton, Downham Old Town, East Downham, East Guiltcross, Emneth with Outwell, Harling and Heathlands, Hilgay with Denver, Mershe Lande,  Mid Forest, Nar Valley, North Downham, St Lawrence, South Downham, Swaffham, Thetford Abbey, Thetford Castle, Thetford Guildhall, Thetford Saxon, Upwell and Delph, Walton, Watlington, Wayland, Weeting, Wiggenhall, Wimbotsham with Fincham Wissey.

See also
List of parliamentary constituencies in Norfolk

References

Politics of Norfolk
Norfolk